Forever the Sickest Kids is an American pop punk band, formed in Dallas, Texas in 2006. The group has released three studio albums, four extended plays, ten singles, and ten music videos.

Albums

Studio albums

Extended plays

Featured albums

Singles

Music videos

Covers

Other appearances

References

Discographies of American artists